This is a list of people with surname Spencer.

A

 Abigail Spencer (born 1981), American actress
 Adam Spencer (born 1969), Australian radio presenter, comedian, and media personality
 Adriano Spencer (1959–2006), Portuguese footballer
 Alan Spencer, American television writer and producer
 Alan Spencer (cricketer) (born 1936), English cricketer
 Albert Spencer, 7th Earl Spencer (1892–1975), British peer
 Albert Spencer (footballer) ( 1920s), English footballer
 Alberto Spencer (1937–2006), Ecuadorian football player
 Alf Spencer, English footballer
 Ambrose Spencer (1765–1848), American lawyer and politician
 Andre Spencer (born 1964), American basketball player
 Anna Garlin Spencer (1851–1931), American educator, feminist, and Unitarian minister
 Anne Spencer (disambiguation), multiple people, including:
Anne Spencer (1882–1975), American poet
Anne Spencer, Countess of Sunderland (1683–1716)
Anne Spencer, Countess of Sunderland (died 1715)
Anne Spencer (WRNS officer) (1938–2012), director of the Women's Royal Naval Service
 Aubrey Spencer (1795–1872), Anglican Bishop of Jamaica

B

 Baldwin Spencer (born 1948), Prime Minister of Antigua and Barbuda
 Baldwin Spencer (anthropologist) (1860–1929), worked in Australia
 Barb Spencer (born 1966), Canadian curler
 Barbara J. Spencer, Australian-Canadian economist
 Benjamin T. Spencer (1904–1996), American professor of literature
 Bernard Spencer (1909–1963), English poet, translator, and editor
 Bob Spencer (born 1957), Australian rock guitarist
 Brian Spencer (1949–1988), Canadian ice hockey player
 Brian Spencer (field hockey) (born 1962), American field hockey player
 Bruce Spencer, American drummer
 Bud Spencer (1929–2016), Italian actor, filmmaker and professional swimmer

C

 Carlos Spencer (born 1975), New Zealand rugby union footballer
 Caroline Spencer (suffragist) (1861–1928), American physician and suffragist
 Charles Spencer (disambiguation), multiple people including:
Charles Spencer, 3rd Earl of Sunderland (1675–1722), English statesman
Charles Spencer, 3rd Duke of Marlborough (1706–1758), British soldier and politician
Lord Charles Spencer (1740–1820), 2nd son of the 3rd Duke of Marlborough
Charles Spencer, 6th Earl Spencer (1857–1922), British courtier and Liberal politician
Charles Spencer, 9th Earl Spencer (born 1964), brother of Diana, Princess of Wales
Charles Spencer (journalist) (born 1955), British journalist and drama critic
Charles Spencer (American football) (born 1982), American football player
 Charlie Spencer (1899–1953), England and Newcastle United footballer
 Charlotte Spencer, Countess Spencer (1835–1903), British peeress
 Charlotte Spencer (actress), (born 1991), English actress
 Chaske Spencer (born 1975), American actor
 Chris Spencer (disambiguation), multiple people, including:
Chris Spencer (actor) (born 1968), American actor, comedian, writer and producer
Chris Spencer (American football) (born 1982), American football player
 Christopher Miner Spencer (1833–1922), American inventor
 Colin Spencer (born 1933), English writer
 Cynthia Spencer, Countess Spencer (1897–1972), British peeress

D

 Dan Spencer (born 1965), American baseball coach
 Daniel Spencer (disambiguation), multiple people, including:
Daniel Spencer (Mormon) (1794–1868), mayor of Nauvoo, Illinois and Mormon pioneer
Daniel Spencer (environmentalist), Australian climate activist
 Danielle Spencer (disambiguation), multiple people, including:
Danielle Spencer (American actress) (born 1965), African-American actress
Danielle Spencer (Australian actress) (born 1969), Australian singer, songwriter and actress
 Dante Spencer, American model and actor
 David Spencer (disambiguation), multiple people, including:
David A. Spencer, American engineering professor
David D. Spencer (1799–1855), New York editor and politician
David W. Spencer, Canadian department store founder
David Spencer (playwright) (born 1955), British playwright
 Denzel Spencer (born 1996), Canadian singer, rapper and songwriter known professionally as Roy Woods
 Derek Spencer (born 1936), British politician
 Derrick Spencer (born 1982), South African footballer
 Diana Russell, Duchess of Bedford, Duchess of Bedford (1710–1735), wife of 4th Duke of Bedford
 Diana, Princess of Wales Lady Diana Spencer (1961–1997), first wife of Prince Charles
 Domina Eberle Spencer (1920–2022), American mathematician
 Don Spencer (born 1941), Australian children's television presenter and musician
 Don Spencer (cricketer) (1912–1971), English cricketer
 Donald C. Spencer (1912–2001), American mathematician
 Dorothy Spencer, Countess of Sunderland (1617–1684), British peeress

E
 E. Spencer Miller (1817–1879), Dean of the University of Pennsylvania Law School

 Earl Winfield Spencer Jr. (1888–1950), United States Navy pilot
 Earle Spencer (born 1926), American big band leader from the late 1940s
 Edmund Spenser (c. 1552–1599), poet, author of The Faerie Queene
 Edmund Spencer (chess player) (1876–1936), English chess master
 Edward Spencer (disambiguation), multiple people, including:
 Edward Spencer (athlete) (1882–1965), British race walker
 Edward Spencer (English politician) (1594–1656), English politician
 Elihu Spencer (1721–1784), American clergyman
 Elizabeth Spencer (disambiguation), multiple people, including:
 Lady Elizabeth Spencer (1737–1831), wife of Henry Herbert, 10th Earl of Pembroke
 Elizabeth Spencer, Baroness Hunsdon (1552–1618), English scholar, and arts patron
 Elizabeth Spencer (writer) (1921–2019), American novelist and short story writer
 Elizabeth Spencer (soprano) (died 1935), American soprano, recorded for Thomas Edison
 Elmore Spencer (born 1969), American basketball player
 Emerson Spencer (1906–1985), American sprint runner
 Emily Spencer Hayden (1869–1949), American photographer

F

 Fannie Morris Spencer (1865–1943), composer and organist
 Fanny Bixby Spencer (1879–1930), American philanthropist and activist
 Felton Spencer (born 1968), American basketball player
 Florence Margaret Spencer Palmer (1900–1987), composer
 Francis Spencer, 1st Baron Churchill (1779–1845), British peer and Whig politician
 Freddie Spencer (born 1961), American motorcycle racer
 Frederick Spencer, 4th Earl Spencer (1798–1857), British naval commander and Whig politician
 Fred Spencer (1904–1938), American animator
 Fred Spencer (footballer) (1871–1959), English footballer
 F. Richard Spencer (born 1951), Roman Catholic bishop for US military

G

 G. Lloyd Spencer (1893–1981), American politician from Arkansas
 George Spencer (disambiguation), multiple people including:
George Spencer, 4th Duke of Marlborough (1739–1817), British courtier and politician
George Spencer, 2nd Earl Spencer (1758–1834), British Whig politician
George Spencer (bishop) (1799–1866), Anglican bishop
George E. Spencer (1836–1893), American senator from Alabama
George Alfred Spencer (1872–1957), Member of Parliament for Broxtowe, 1918–1929
George Spencer (baseball) (1926–2014), American baseball pitcher
George Spencer (rugby) (1878–1950), New Zealand rugby football player
 Gillian Spencer (born 1939), American soap opera actress and writer
 Glenn Spencer, American political and anti-illegal immigration activist
 Glenn Spencer (baseball) (1905–1958), American baseball pitcher
 Gwendolyn Spencer (1916–2015), Jamaican nurse and midwife

H

 Harry Spencer (disambiguation), multiple people, including:
Harry Spencer (cricketer, born 1868) (1868–1937), cricketer for Derbyshire
Harry Spencer (cricketer, born 1901) (1901–1954), cricketer for Worcestershire and Warwickshire
Harry Spencer (footballer), New Zealand footballer
 Hazelton Spencer (1757–1813), Upper Canadian soldier, political figure and judge
 Henry Spencer (disambiguation), multiple people, including:
Henry Spencer (born 1955), Canadian computer programmer and space enthusiast
Henry Spencer, 1st Earl of Sunderland (1620–1643), English nobleman and soldier
Lord Henry Spencer (1770–1795), British diplomat and politician
Henry Elvins Spencer (1882–1972), Canadian politician
Henry E. Spencer (1807–1882), American politician, mayor of Cincinnati
 Herbert Spencer (disambiguation), multiple people, including:
Herbert Spencer (1820–1903), English philosopher and biologist
Herbert Spencer (graphic designer) (1924–2002), British graphic designer
Herbert Harvey Spencer (1869–1926), English manufacturer and Liberal Party politician
Herbert Lincoln Spencer (1894–1960), president of Bucknell University from 1945–49
Herbert W. Spencer (1905–1992), American film and television composer and orchestrator
 Howard Spencer (1875–1940), English footballer

I
 Ian Spencer (born 1984), English cricketer
 Ivan Q. Spencer (1888–1970), American Pentecostal minister
 Ivor Spencer (1924–2009), English chef, toastmaster, and entrepreneur

J

 James Spencer (disambiguation), multiple people
 Jane Spencer (disambiguation), multiple people, including:
Jane Spencer (journalist), American journalist
Jane Spencer (director), American film director
Jane Spencer, Baroness Churchill (1826–1900), English peeress
 Jean Spencer (gymnast) (born 1940), New Zealand Olympic gymnast
 Jean Spencer (artist) (1942–1998), British artist
 Jeremy Spencer (disambiguation), multiple people, including:
Jeremy Spencer (born 1948), of Fleetwood Mac
Jeremy Spencer (drummer) (born 1973), of Five Finger Death Punch
 Jesse Spencer (born 1979),  Australian actor and musician
 Jim Spencer (1946–2002), American baseball first baseman
 Jimmy Spencer (racing driver) (born 1957), American television commentator and NASCAR driver
 Joe Spencer (American football) (1923–1996), American football player
 Joel Spencer (born 1946) American mathematician
 John Spencer (disambiguation), multiple people
 Jon Spencer (born 1965), American singer, composer and guitarist
 Joseph Spencer (1714–1789), American lawyer and politician from Connecticut
 Joseph Spencer (New York politician) (1790–1823), American lawyer and politician from New York
 Joshua A. Spencer (1790–1857), American lawyer and New York politician
 June Spencer (born 1919), English actress

K
 Karyn Spencer, American film director
 Kenneth Spencer (disambiguation), multiple people, including:
Kenneth A. Spencer (1902–1960), American philanthropist and businessman in the chemical industry
Kenneth Abendana Spencer (1929–2005), Jamaican painter
Kenneth Spencer (singer) (1913–1964), American singer and actor
 Kevin Spencer (disambiguation), multiple people, including:
Kevin Spencer (musician) (born 1978), Canadian singer-songwriter
Kevin Spencer (American football) (born 1953), American football coach for the Arizona Cardinals
Kevin Spencer (cyclist), Australian cyclist
 Kim Spencer (born 1948), American television producer and executive
 Lady Kitty Spencer (born 1990), English model
 Kyle Spencer (born 1976), male former tennis player from the United Kingdom

L
 Lara Spencer (born 1969), American television journalist
 Larry Spencer (born 1941), Canadian pastor and politician
 Larry O. Spencer (born 1954), United States Air Force general
 Len Spencer (1867–1914), American recording artist
 Leonard James Spencer (1870–1959), British geologist
 Lindsay Spencer (1914–1997), Australian rugby league footballer
 Loretta Spencer (born 1937), American politician, mayor of Huntsville, Alabama
 Louis Spencer, Viscount Althorp (born 1994)

M
 Marian Spencer (1920–2019), American politician
 Mark Spencer (disambiguation), multiple people
 Marquiss Spencer (born 1997), American football player
 Mary Spencer, Canadian boxer
 Mary C. Spencer (1842–1923), American librarian
 Mason Spencer (1892–1962), American lawyer, planter, and politician from Louisiana
 Megan Spencer (born 1966), Australian documentary film maker
 Michael Spencer (born 1955), British businessman
 Mike Spencer, English record producer

N
 Nicholas Spencer, (1633–1689), English merchant and politician emigrated to Colony of Virginia
 Noel Spencer (born 1977), Australian (soccer) football player and coach

O

 Octavia Spencer (born 1970), American actress, author, producer
 Oliver Spencer (1736–1811), American Revolutionary War officer from New Jersey
 Oliver M. Spencer (1829–1895), American president of the University of Iowa
 Ollie Spencer (1931–1991), American football tackle and assistant coach
 Orson Spencer (1802–1855), American writer and prominent member of The Church of Jesus Christ of Latter-day Saints

P

 Pam Spencer (born 1957), American high jumper 
 Paula Spencer (journalist), American journalist and author
 Peggy Spencer (1920–2016), British ballroom dancer and choreographer
 Percy Spencer (1894–1970), American physicist and inventor of the microwave oven
 Peter Spencer (disambiguation), multiple people, including:
Peter Spencer (religious leader) (1782–1843), American Christian leader
Peter Spencer (journalist) (active 1970s onwards), British television news journalist
Peter Spencer (Royal Navy officer) (born 1947), British naval officer and procurement chief
Peter Spencer (footballer) (born 1956), Australian rules footballer
Peter Spencer (farmer) (born c. 1948), Australian political activist
 Phil Spencer (television personality) (born 1969), British television presenter and journalist
 Phil Spencer (business executive), American business executive
 Philip Spencer (sailor) (1823–1842), American midshipman 
 Platt Rogers Spencer (1800–1864), American calligrapher

R

 Ray Spencer (born 1933), English footballer
 Richard Spencer (disambiguation), multiple people including:
Richard Spencer (died 1661) (1593–1661), English politician and Royalist
Richard Spencer (Maryland) (1796–1868), member of US House of Representatives
Richard Lewis Spencer, African-American musician and teacher
Richard Spencer (Royal Navy officer) (1779–1839)
Richard Spencer (journalist) (born 1965), British journalist
Richard Spencer (athlete) (born 1955), Cuban former high jumper
Richard B. Spencer (born 1978), American white supremacist writer, publisher, and activist
 Robert Spencer (disambiguation), multiple people including:
Robert Spencer, 2nd Earl of Sunderland
Robert Spencer, 4th Earl of Sunderland
Robert Spencer (artist) (1879–1931), American painter
Robert Spencer (author) (born 1962), American author, blogger, and critic of Islam
Robert Spencer (doctor) (1889–1969), American general practitioner and abortion care provider
 Ron Spencer, American fantasy illustrator
 Roy Spencer (disambiguation), multiple people, including:
Roy Spencer (scientist), American meteorologist and research scientist
Roy Spencer (baseball) (1900–1973), American Major League Baseball catcher
Roy Spencer (actor), British actor, special effects technician, and author
 Russ Spencer (born 1979), English television presenter and singer

S

 Sam Spencer (1902–1987), English footballer
 Samuel Spencer (disambiguation), multiple people, including:
Samuel M. Spencer (1875–1960), politician on Hawaii island
Samuel R. Spencer (1871–1961), American politician, Lieutenant Governor of Connecticut
Samuel Spencer (railroad executive) (1847–1906), American civil engineer and businessman
 Sandra Spencer (born 1973), British actress
 S. B. Spencer (1827–1901), American politician
 Scott Spencer (disambiguation), multiple people, including:
Scott Spencer (writer) (born 1945), American writer
Scott A. Spencer (born 1970), American abstract painter
Scott Spencer (footballer) (born 1989), English footballer
 Sean Spencer (disambiguation), multiple people
 Selden P. Spencer (1862–1925), American politician
 Shane Spencer (born 1972), American baseball player
 Shawntae Spencer (born 1982), American football player
 Si Spencer, British comic book writer
 Spike Spencer (born 1968), American voice actor
 Stan Spencer (born 1968), American baseball player
 Sir Stanley Spencer (1891–1959), English painter
 Stuart Spencer (footballer) (born 1932), Australian footballer
 Stuart Spencer (political consultant), American political consultant

T
 Ted Spencer, American lacrosse coach
 Terry Spencer (born 1931), English cricketer
 Terry Spencer (RAF officer) (1918–2009), British World War II fighter ace and photographer
 Thomas Spencer (disambiguation), multiple people
 Tim Spencer (American football) (born 1960), American football player
 Tom Spencer (disambiguation), multiple people, including:
Tom Spencer (rugby league), an English rugby league footballer
Tom Spencer (baseball) (born 1951), Chicago White Sox outfielder and minor league manager
Tom Spencer (cricketer) (1914–1995), British cricketer and international umpire
Tom Spencer (politician), former Conservative Member of the European Parliament
Tom Spencer (musician), British singer and guitarist
 Tracie Spencer (born 1976), American R&B/pop singer–songwriter, actress, and model
 Tracy Spencer (born 1962), British Italo disco singer and actress

U
 Unity Spencer (1930–2017), British artist

V
 Vaino Spencer (1920–2016), American judge
 Victor Spencer (1894–1918), New Zealand soldier
 Victor Spencer, 1st Viscount Churchill (1864–1934)

W

 Sir Walter Baldwin Spencer (1860–1929), English-Australian biologist and anthropologist
 Walter Spencer (Canadian football) (born 1978), Canadian football linebacker
 Wen Spencer (born 1963), American writer
 William Spencer (disambiguation), multiple people
 Williametta Spencer (born 1927), composer

Y
 Yancy Spencer III (1950–2011), American surfer

First name unknown
 Spencer (baseball) (fl. 1872), American baseball player
 Spencer (Essex cricketer) (fl. 1790s), English first-class cricketer

Families
the Spencer family, including
The Earls Spencer
Winston Spencer Churchill
The Lady Diana Spencer (later Diana, Princess of Wales)

Compound surname
These people have Spencer as part of a compound surname:

 G. Spencer-Brown, (born 1923), English polymath
 People with the surname Spencer-Churchill
 People with the surname Spencer-Nairn
 People with the surname Spencer-Smith
 Oliver Spencer-Wortley (born 1984), English composer and songwriter

Fictional characters
 Betty Spencer, from Some Mothers Do 'Ave 'Em
Bill Spencer, from The Bold and the Beautiful
Bill Spencer, Jr.,  from The Bold and the Beautiful
 Bobbie Spencer, from General Hospital
 Caroline Forrester, from The Bold and the Beautiful
 Caroline Spencer, from The Bold and the Beautiful
 Frank Spencer, from Some Mothers Do 'Ave 'Em
 Henry Spencer (Psych), from Psych
 Joe Spencer (Hollyoaks), from Hollyoaks
 Karen Spencer, from The Bold and the Beautiful
 Laura Spencer, from General Hospital
 Liam Spencer, from The Bold and the Beautiful
 Lucky Spencer, from General Hospital
 Luke Spencer, from General Hospital
 Lulu Spencer, from General Hospital
 Olivia Spencer, from Guiding Light
 Shawn Spencer, from Psych
 Ozwell E. Spencer, from Resident Evil
 Will Spencer, from The Bold and the Beautiful
 Wyatt Spencer, from The Bold and the Beautiful

See also
 Spence (surname)
 Spencer (disambiguation)
 Spencer's (disambiguation)
 Spens (disambiguation)
 Spenser (disambiguation)

Lists of people by surname